The Cumberland Highlanders was an infantry regiment of the Non-Permanent Active Militia of the Canadian Militia (now the Canadian Army). In 1936, the regiment was Amalgamated with The Colchester and Hants Regiment to form The North Nova Scotia Highlanders.

Lineage

The Cumberland Highlanders 

 Originated on 6 April 1871, in Amherst, Nova Scotia, as the Cumberland Provisional Battalion of Infantry.
 Redesignated on 12 June 1885, as the 93rd Cumberland Battalion of Infantry.
 Redesignated on 8 May 1900, as the 93rd Cumberland Regiment.
 Redesignated on 29 March 1920, as The Cumberland Regiment.
 Redesignated on 15 June 1927, as The Cumberland Highlanders.
 Amalgamated on 1 December 1936, with The Colchester and Hants Regiment (less C Company) and C Company of the 6th Machine Gun Battalion, CMGC (now The Princess Louise Fusiliers), and Redesignated as The North Nova Scotia Highlanders (Machine Gun).

Perpetuations 

 193rd Battalion (Nova Scotia Highlanders), CEF

History

Early History 
On 6 April 1871, the Cumberland Provisional Battalion of Infantry was organized from four independent companies in Amherst; River Philip; Maccan and River Herbert, Tidnish, Nova Scotia.

On 12 June 1885, the battalion was Redesignated as the 93rd Cumberland Battalion of Infantry.

The South African War 
During the South African War, the 93rd Cumberland Battalion of Infantry contributed volunteers for the Canadian Contingents, most notably for the 2nd (Special Service) Battalion, Royal Canadian Regiment.

Early 1900s 
As a part of the country wide reorganisation of the Canadian Militia at the start of the 20th Century, on 8 May 1900, the regiment was Redesignated as the 93rd Cumberland Regiment.

The Great War 
On 15 July 1916, the 193rd Battalion (Nova Scotia Highlanders), CEF was authorized for service and on 12 October 1916, the battalion embarked for Great Britain. After its arrival in the UK, the battalion provided reinforcements for the Canadian Corps in the field. On 20 January 1917, the battalion's personnel were absorbed by the 17th Reserve Battalion, CEF. On 18 February 1918, the 193rd Battalion, CEF was disbanded.

1920s-1930s 
On 1 April 1920, as a result of the reorganization of the Canadian Militia following the Otter Commission, the 93rd Cumberland Regiment was Redesignated as The Cumberland Regiment.

On 16 June 1927, the regiment was Redesignated as The Cumberland Highlanders.

On 1 December 1936, as a result of the 1936 Canadian Militia Reorganization, The Cumberland Highlanders were Amalgamated with The Colchester and Hants Regiment and “C” Company of the 6th Machine Gun Battalion, CMGC to form The North Nova Scotia Highlanders (Machine Gun) (now part of The Nova Scotia Highlanders).

Battle Honours

South African War 

 South Africa, 1899-1900

Great War 

 Arras, 1917, '18
 Ypres, 1917
 Amiens
 Hindenburg Line
 Pursuit to Mons

See also 

 Canadian-Scottish regiment

Notes and references 

North Nova Scotia Highlanders
Nova Scotia Highlanders
Former infantry regiments of Canada
Highland & Scottish regiments of Canada
Scottish regiments
Highland regiments
Military units and formations of Nova Scotia